Stephenson Campus, one of the three campuses of the SMB College Group, is located at Thornborough Way, Coalville, Leicestershire, England. It was created as a new build when the former college in Bridge Road, Coalville, closed in 2005.

This campus is known for its Technical and Trade aspects including construction courses and facilities. In 2022, the Stephenson Campus was awarded Construction Apprenticeship Provider of the Year for its partnership with Barratt Developments.

Part of the campus is used by the Stephenson Studio School.

References

External links
College website

Further education colleges in Leicestershire
Coalville